Tüpraş Izmit Oil Refinery is an oil refinery in Izmit, western Turkey. It is owned and operated by Tüpraş. Amongst others it refines Urals crude. Its capacity is slightly less than that of Tüpraş Izmir. It produces diesel fuel.

References 

Oil refineries in Turkey
Kocaeli Province